Scherzo is a Big Finish Productions audio drama based on the long-running British science fiction television series Doctor Who. It is the beginning of the "Divergent Universe" saga which continued until The Next Life.

Plot
The Doctor and Charley are all alone in a new universe without the TARDIS as it, much like them, has no meaning.  With their senses failing, they must confront not only their feelings for each other, but also a creature they can only hear.

Cast
Paul McGann as the Doctor
India Fisher as Charley

Continuity
The "Divergent Universe" story arc that begins here comes to an end in The Next Life.

Notes
A drama for two actors is often referred to as a "two-hander".  This story is a two-hander, and its cover is a visual pun.
India Fisher plays Charley in another two person story, the Companion Chronicles story Solitaire, with David Bailie as the Celestial Toymaker.

External links
Big Finish Productions - Scherzo

2003 audio plays
Eighth Doctor audio plays
Evolution in popular culture
Audio plays by Robert Shearman
Two-handers